Tom Braidwood (born September 27, 1948) is a Canadian actor and director known for the role of Melvin Frohike, one of the conspiracy theorists known as The Lone Gunmen on the American television series The X-Files. Braidwood also served as an assistant director on the show from seasons one through five; was a second unit director on Millennium, another series from Chris Carter, the creator of The X-Files; and a producer of the second season of the Canadian TV series Da Vinci's Inquest, on which he also directed some episodes.

In addition to The X-Files, Braidwood also appeared as Frohike in the spin-off series The Lone Gunmen, which aired 13 episodes in 2001.  In 2006, Braidwood appeared in two episodes of the series Whistler, and in 2009 appeared in the movies Messages Deleted and Alien Trespass.

References

External links
 

1948 births
Living people
Canadian male film actors
Canadian male television actors
Male actors from British Columbia